This is a list of castles, palaces and manors in Jelenia Góra valley and the surrounding area.

 Chojnik castle ruin near Sobieszów – formerly Count of Schaffgotsch
 Stara Kamienica castle ruin – original family seat of the Count of Schaffgotsch
 castle ruin near Rybnica
 castle ruin near Janowice – formerly Count of Stolberg-Wernigerode
 castle ruin near Dąbrowica
 castle ruin near Karpniki
 Siedlçin castle – formerly comital manor Schaffgotsch family
 Plakowice palace near Lwówek Sląski – Renaissance palace, now sanatorium
 Wleń palace – now private
 Wleński Gródek castle ruin and palace
 Nielestno palace – formerly Count of Reden, now hospital
 Czernica palace – now private
 Maciejowiec palace – palace and manor, ruinous
 Barcinek manor – ruinous
 Dziwiszów palace and manor – manor, ruinous
 Grabary manor – ruinous
 palace in Jelenia Gora – built by family Kramst, now hotel
 Czarne palace in Jelenia Gora – Renaissance palace, now ecological center
 Dąbrowica palace – ruinous
 Łomnica palace – great palace and widow palace with park, now cultural center and palace hotel of family von Küster
 Wojanów palace – former comital palace Wied, princess Louise of the Netherlands, renovated 2007
 Bobrów palace – ruinous
 Mysłakowice palace – palace and church by Karl Friedrich Schinkel, park by Peter Joseph Lenné, owner August Neidhardt von Gneisenau and Frederick William III of Prussia, now school
 Milków palace – formerly Counts of Schmettau and Count Matuschka–Topolczan, now palace hotel
 castle ruin (478 m) near Dolny Sciegny
 Trzcińsko palace – demolished
 Miedzianka palace – demolished
 Maciejowa palace – demolished
 Janowice palace – formerly Counts of Stolberg–Wernigerode
 Mniszków Dwor manor near Janowice
 Radomierz manor – ruinous
 Komarno palace – moated castle
 Karpniki palace – moated castle with park, formerly prince Wilhelm I. of Hessen-Darmstadt, now private
 Bukowiec palace – formerly Countess von Reden, now academy, with park und Belvedere
 Kowary palace – formerly von Reuß-Köstritz, now private
 Kowary palace – Palais Radziwill, princess Radziwill and prince Wilhelm I., now clinical center
 Staniszów palace and manor – formerly von Reuss Junior Line, now palace hotel, manor demolished
 castle ruin near Sosnówka – artificial ruin, formerly von Reuß
 Podgórzyn manor – demolished
 Sobieszów palace – formerly Count of Schaffgotsch
 Pakoszów palace
 Cieplice Sląski Zdrój – palace Count of Schaffgotsch and Zietenschloss, formerly Hans Ernst Karl von Zieten)

External links 
 The land of a thousand castles and palaces (Velvet Escape)

Silesian culture
History of Silesia
Prussian cultural sites
Castles
Palaces in Poland
German Empire-related lists

de:Liste der Burgen und Schlösser im Hirschberger Tal